The 2018 World Snowshoe Championships was the 11th edition of the global snowshoe running competition, World Snowshoe Championships, organised by the World Snowshoe Federation and took place in Picos de Europa from 2 to 3 March 2018.

Results

Male Overall

Female Overall

References

External links 
 World Snowshoe Federation official web site

World Snowshoe Championships